Raoul Gradis (15 June 1861 – 18 June 1943) was a French painter, composer and shipowner.

Origins 

Raoul Gradis was the son of  Moïse Henri Gradis (1823–1905) and Hanna Claire (Brandame) Gradis (1835–1925).
His family was Jewish, and had probably moved to Bordeaux from Portugal around 1495.
From 1685 onward the Gradis family was a wealthy line of merchants and shipowners. 
They corresponded with all the main markets of Europe, and were prominent in trade between France and the Caribbean, Canada and the United States.
From before the French Revolution the family was recognized as leaders of the French Jewish community.
The family company David Gradis & fils traded in wines, spirits and fabrics.
The Gradis house received important privileges, particularly in Martinique and Saint Domingo, in return for their services to the state. 
Raoul's father Henri Gradis, who was deputy mayor of Bordeaux, wrote a history of Bordeaux and several literary works.

Early life

David Alexandre Raoul Gradis was born in Bordeaux on 15 June 1861.
Raoul Gradis enlisted in the army in 1881, became a lieutenant in 1884, then was made captain in the 23rd territorial artillery regiment.
He studied painting under Maxime Lalanne at the Ecole des Beaux-arts de Bordeaux, then under Ferdinand Humbert and Henri Gervex at the Ecole des Beaux-arts de Paris. He exhibited at the Salon des Amis des Arts from 1886, and was a member of the Salon.
Gradis wrote several musical works including "Poem for piano and violin."
He was an associate of the Society of French Artists and a member of the Philomathique Society of Bordeaux.

Raoul Gradis married Suzanne Fould in 1888.
His wife was daughter of Paul Fould, Master of Requests of the French council of state, and Eve Mathilde de Günzburg.
Her maternal grandfather was baron Joseph de Günzburg of St. Petersburg, Russia.
Their children were Gaston Gradis (1889–1968), Marie-Louise Rachel Minna Blanchy (born 1894), who married Bernard Blanchy, and Jean Gradis (1900–1975).
In 1899 his sister Esther Lucie Gabrielle Alice Emma Gradis (1866-1925) married Georges Julien Schwob d'Héricourt.
Georges Schwob d'Héricourt became Raoul Gradis's business partner.

Later career

Raoul Gradis succeeded his father as head of the Maison Gradis 1905, working with Georges Schwob d'Héricourt.
During World War I (1914–18) "David Gradis et Fils" was responsible for ensuring France's entire supply of sugar.
Raoul's sons Gaston and Jean Gradis served on the front as artillery officers.
In 1921 Raoul Gradis and Georges Schwob d'Héricourt changed the name of David Gradis et Fils to the Société française pour le commerce avec les colonies et l'étranger (SFCCE).
Georges Schwob d'Héricourt was president and Raul Gradis vice-president.

Gradis was president of the Union for Assistance of the 16th arrondissement of Paris and a member of the International Assistance Society, the Committee for Disaster Relief of Martinique, the committee of the Philanthropic Society and the General Council for extinction of begging in Bordeaux.
He was made a Knight of the Legion of Honour and received the Ordre des Palmes Académiques, Royal Order of Cambodia and Order of Glory (Tunisia).

During the first part of World War II (1939–45) Raoul Gradis was president of the Jewish Consistory and head of the Jewish community in Bordeaux.
On 6 June 1942 Raoul Gradis received his yellow star (badge of a Jew) from the police, but did not have to make it himself or to supply the textile used.
In August 1942 Gradis asked for an exemption from the restrictions on movement imposed on Jews. 
He explained that at the age of 81, with a broken arm, he would like to go to the house in the country  from Bordeaux that his family had owned since 1680. He had respected the new decrees and had resigned from the vice-presidency of his business. His property had been seized and his home in Lormont had been requisitioned by the occupying forces. He noted that his son Gaston had been exempted from restrictions due to his service in the First World War.
On 2 September 1943 SS Captain Doberschütz rejected the request.

Raoul Gradis died on 18 June 1943.

Works 
 Une expérience de philanthropie à la Martinique (1904)
 Poème pour piano et violon
 Partitions des quatuors n° 1 et n° 2 pour piano
 VIII pièces pour piano (1906)

References

Sources

1861 births
1943 deaths
19th-century French painters
French male painters
20th-century French painters
20th-century French male artists
19th-century French Sephardi Jews
Gradis family
Artists from Bordeaux
19th-century French male artists
French people of Portuguese-Jewish descent